DWXR (101.7 FM) is a radio station in the Philippines owned by Iddes Broadcast Group and operated by Hirxay Advertising & Media Services. Its studios and transmitter are located at the 3rd Floor, Palmero Bldg., Brgy. Tawiran, Calapan.

References

External links
DWXR FB Page
DWXR Website

Radio stations established in 2011
Radio stations in Mindoro